Owen Williams may refer to:

Politicians
 Owen Williams (politician, born 1764) (1764–1832), Member of Parliament for Great Marlow, 1796–1832
 Owen Williams (British Army officer) (1836–1913), British general and Member of Parliament for Great Marlow, 1880–1885

Sportsmen
 Owen Williams (Australian cricketer) (1847–1917), Australian cricketer
 Owen Williams (South African cricketer) (born 1932), South African cricketer
Owen Williams (footballer, born 1873)
 Owen Williams (footballer, born 1896) (1896–1960), English football player
 Owen Williams (rugby union, born 1986), Welsh rugby union player
 Owen Williams (rugby union, born 1991), Welsh rugby union centre
 Owen Williams (rugby union, born 1992), Welsh rugby union fly-half
 Owen Williams (tennis) (born 1931), South African tennis player

Others
 Owen Williams (engineer) (1890–1969), English civil engineer
 Owen Williams (Owen Gwyrfai) (1790–1874), Welsh antiquary and author
 R. Owen Williams, Transylvania University president